= Linda Chikamso Jiwuaku =

Nigerian footballer (born 2006)

Linda Chikamso Jiwuaku (born 6 June 2006) is a Nigerian goalkeeper who has represented the Nigeria women's national under‑17 football team (the Flamingos) and earned her first senior squad call‑up for the Super Falcons during the 2024 Olympic qualifiers.

== Early life and youth career ==
Jiwuaku was born in Nigeria on 6 June 2006. Standing around 175 cm tall, she rose through club youth ranks, notably playing with Bayelsa Queens and featuring in national youth development camps.

== International career ==
In 2022, Jiwuaku was part of a 35 player Flamingos preparatory camp for the FIFA U‑17 Women's World Cup in India, alongside teammates like Faith Omilana and Jessica Inyiama.

She was included in the final 21‑player squad for the tournament, facing opponents from Germany, Chile, and New Zealand in the group stage.

Jiwuaku played two matches in the tournament.

In the quarter‑final shootout against the USA, she was brought on to replace Omilana and saved one penalty, helping Nigeria secure a historic win.

In the semi‑final vs Colombia, she again entered for the shootout, but Nigeria lost 5–6. Despite criticism, many reminded fans she had previously been instrumental in earlier victories.

== Senior national team ==
In February 2024, at age 17, Jiwuaku received her first call‑up to the senior Nigeria women's national team, the Super Falcons, selected by coach Justin Madugu for Olympic qualifying matches against Cameroon.
